Niota (also East Fort Madison, East Fort Madison Station) is an unincorporated community in Appanoose Township, Hancock County, in the U.S. state of Illinois. The community is located on the bank of the Mississippi River and is at the eastern end of the Fort Madison Toll Bridge, which connects Niota to Fort Madison, Iowa. Niota is the western terminus of Illinois Route 9 and is also served by Illinois Route 96, which is part of the Great River Road.

History
The community has fought Mississippi River flooding (cresting levees) through its history. In response to Upper Mississippi River flooding in April 1965, the US Coast Guard sent its Goldenrod to the community on May 3, 1965, for relief.

During the July 1993 flooding, inmates helped local residents to reinforce the levees in order to save the community. The effort failed, and the 1993 flood damage from the Mississippi River was the worst in its history. The Federal Emergency Management Agency (FEMA) proposed that the community be relocated and incorporated at a cost of $8.5 million, though most townspeople preferred to stay where they were.

Geography

Demographics

References

 1993 Mississippi River Record Stages and Levee Failures along the Illinois Border

Unincorporated communities in Illinois
Unincorporated communities in Hancock County, Illinois
Illinois populated places on the Mississippi River